The Kulhaiya Sheikh (Urdu: کلاحیا) is a Muslim community found in the northeastern part of the Indian state of Bihar as well as the terai region of south-east Nepal.  

The founding members of this community belonged to the Hadhrami-origin tribe of Yemen settled on the  coast of Horn of Africa who came as mercenaries and sellsword to North-east Bihar via Sindh and Kutchh, on the invitation of the Bengal Sultanate for reinforcement of Purnea Division army bastion. The mercenaries started marrying local Rajput & Babhan (Bhumihar) women in large numbers as well as the womenfolks from Rajbongshi, Kayastha, and Yadav communities. In the later stages the Gurjara nomads of Kutchh and Gujarat, Jats of Sindh and Kurmis of present-day Uttar Pradesh who were renowned for their agricultural acumen were invited by local powerful vassals, with the permission of the Bengal Sultanate which had the marital relations with the Nawab of Junagadh, as the surplus pasture and arable lands were turning into barren wastelands due to incessant floods and subsistence agriculture practiced by indigenous locals. Together all of these migrant communities along with the local indigenous populace intermarried extensively amongst themselves, gradually evolving into a unique and intra-genetically diverse but single ethnicity, which over the time became structurally rigid and endogamous. With a distinct culture as well as a Maithili and Kutchhi-based lingua franca and eventual acceptance of Islam as the common religion, the community came to be known as 'Kulhaiya'.

Etymology
The word 'Kulhaiya' came from Persian language combining words 'kul (کل)' meaning complete and 'haya (حیا)' meaning modesty. Some chronicle accounts of the community state that it came from word 'Kulah' which means turban cap which the founding members from Yemen wore while other believe it to come from Sanskrit word 'Kul' meaning tribe or family. Most of the customs and practices followed by Kulhaiyas are adopted from local indigenous Hindu communities which combined with the cultures brought by the migrant ethnicities evolved into a unique and distinct culture.

History

Origin
Founding members of the Kulahiya community were preferred for soldiers in the Bengal Sultanate due to their mercenary background. The Faujdars of Purnea at the time of the Mughal Nawab of Bengal, Saif Khan, appointed kulahiyas to protect Indian border on the side of Nepal against the invading Gurung and Gurkha tribes. The original members of this community were Arab mercenaries and sellswords from Hadhrami tribe of Yemen. They came to the North-eastern region of Bihar from Sindh and Kutchh region and settled and married local women from different Hindu castes, mostly from Rajput community, Yadav and  Kayastha community. During Bengal Sultanate regime, some accomplished members  became landlords who then invited on the order of Nawab the Gurjar herders from Gujarat, Jat farmers from Sindh, and Kurmis from UP to migrate to their region with their families because of their agricultural prowess as well as the availability of vast abundant pasture and arable land. Most of the people settled from outside along with the local non-Muslim populace converted to Islam which gradually amalgamated into a unique Muslim community by intermarriages, having a distinct culture and lingua franca, eventually known as the Kulhaiya. In the later period due to advance in status as well as military and agriculture acumen of Kulhaiyas, the members of upper caste Hindus got into this community by converting to Islam, either sincerely or to evade Jizya tax, though they had to pay Zakat in the same way Jizya was paid.

During the British Raj, the community was notified as criminal tribe by the administration.

Kulhaiya is categorised as OBC under the Indian Reservation system.

Education

According to the 2011 Census, male literacy rate of the community is 66% and 55.6% for female. The community is categorised as OBC under education quota system.

Notable people
Late Mohammed Taslimuddin, with a cult following, he was one of the most prominent political figures and  feared strongmen in Bihar & late Shaikh Alimuddin, he was also one of the most prominent zamindar of seemanchal. He belongs to Bardenga village of Araria district.
Zamindar of Balwat,Chanderdai,and Kamaldaha etc. are also very famous in Araria.

Demographics
The Kulhaiyas are predominantly found in erstwhile sultanate-era Purnia division of Bihar which includes present-day districts of Purnia, Araria, Katihar and some parts of Kishanganj of Indian state of Bihar. A sizeable population is also found in Morang district of Nepal. 69.7% of the population is rural-based.

Kulhaiyas are predominantly Muslim which can be gauged by the fact that word 'Muslim' in Seemanchal is synonymous to word 'Kulhaiya'. According to 2011 census, Kulhaiyas constitute 27.6% in Kishanganj, 32.5% in Katihar, 41.1% in Araria and 42.7% in Purnia.

Language
The community speaks Kulhaiya boli (often considered as a dialect of Urdu) closely related to Dhakaiya Urdu; a heavily modified Maithili-Bengali hybrid dialect with a considerable vernacular, phonetic and lexical influence of Gujarati, Kutchhi dialect of Sindhi, Nepali and Urdu. The dialect have large number of Persian and Arabic words due to which it is considered as a dialect of Urdu.

Religion
The community follows Islam under Hanafi jurisprudence. After Deobandi movement with the help of Tablighi Jamaat most of them are attached to Deobandism school of thought.

Present circumstances
Although educationally backward, the community is well-off due to them being medium-to-large agricultural land holders. For this reason and the fact that they are the predominant Muslim community of Seemanchal gave them the political leverage in the politics of Eastern Bihar. Their support can change the fate of any political party in not only the East but the whole of Bihar. Prime Minister of India Mr. Modi during his 2014 electoral campaign tried to forge a connection with dominant kulhaiyas by monetizing their 'Gujarat connection' and calling the community as 'his own' in a bid to pit them against the other dominant  Bengali-speaking Muslim communities such as Surjapuri and Shershahabadia. Late Mohammed Taslimuddin, the charismatic strongman politician of Seemanchal who had a cult following, belonged to this community.
The community is strictly endogamous and avoid inter-caste marriages with neighbouring Muslim sects. The community has a strong rivalry with Shershahabadia and Surjapuri communities who are Bengali speakers.

See also
Shaikh of Bihar

References

Social groups of Pakistan
Social groups of Bihar
Muslim communities of Bihar
Muslim communities of India